The 2020 Koblenz Open was a professional tennis tournament played on indoor hard courts. It was the fourth edition of the tournament which was part of the 2020 ATP Challenger Tour. It took place in Koblenz, Germany from 17 to 23 February 2020.

Singles main-draw entrants

Seeds

 1 Rankings are as of 10 February 2020.

Other entrants
The following players received wildcards into the singles main draw:
  Nino Ehrenschneider
  Marek Gengel
  Milan Welte
  Louis Wessels
  Leopold Zima

The following players received entry from the qualifying draw:
  Lucas Gerch
  Sasikumar Mukund

The following player received entry as a lucky loser:
  Ergi Kırkın

Champions

Singles

 Tomáš Macháč def.  Botic van de Zandschulp 6–3, 4–6, 6–3.

Doubles

 Sander Arends /  David Pel def.  Julian Lenz /  Yannick Maden 7–6(7–4), 7–6(7–3).

References

2020 ATP Challenger Tour
2020
2020 in German tennis
February 2020 sports events in Germany